Caravaca Club de Fútbol , unofficial known as Club de Fútbol La Unión was a Spanish football team based in La Unión, Murcia, in the Region of Murcia. Founded in 2011, it played its only ever season (2011–12) in Segunda División B – Group 4, holding home games at Polideportivo Municipal de La Unión, with a capacity of 3,000 seats.

History
Club de Fútbol La Unión was founded in 1969 as Caravaca CF. In late July 2011, the club moved to neighbouring La Unión, Murcia. 

A few days later, the mayor of Caravaca and several supporters protested to the Royal Spanish Football Federation that the move was illegal.

In June, 2012, La Unión was doubly relegated; from Segunda División B to Preferente Autonómica due to non-payments of wages to their players being later folded.

Season to season

1 season in Segunda División B

References

External links
Club news 

Association football clubs established in 2011
Association football clubs disestablished in 2012
Defunct football clubs in the Region of Murcia
2011 establishments in Spain
2012 disestablishments in Spain